

 
Wauraltee is a locality in the Australian state of South Australia located on the Yorke Peninsula about  west of the state capital of Adelaide and about  south-west of the municipal seat  of Maitland.

Wauraltee's boundaries were created on 27 May 1999  and given the “local established name” which is derived from a local aboriginal word.

The 2016 Australian census which was conducted in August 2016 reports that Wauraltee had a population of 56 people.

Wauraltee is located within the federal division of Grey, the state electoral district of Narungga and the local government area of the Yorke Peninsula Council.

References

Yorke Peninsula